Aleksandr Maksimovich Makarov (September 12, 1906 – October 9, 1999) was the General Director of PA Pivdenmash from 1961 to 1986, Laureate of Lenin and State Awards, twice Hero of Socialist Labor, Honoured Mechanical Engineer of Ukraine, holder of the Order of Prince Yaroslav the Wise, and Honorary Citizen of Dnepropetrovsk.

His memorial bust is located in a public town square in Dnipro.

References

1906 births
1999 deaths
People from Tsimlyansky District
People from Don Host Oblast
Soviet people
Yuzhmash people